Hill Fire may refer to:

 Hill Fire (2017), a wildfire in San Luis Obispo County, California
 Hill Fire (2018), a wildfire in Ventura County, California